Preston Mill is a watermill on the River Tyne at the eastern edge of East Linton on the B1407 Preston Road, in East Lothian, Scotland, UK. It is situated close to Prestonkirk Parish Church,  the Smeaton Hepburn Estate, Smeaton Lake, and Phantassie Doocot. It is a Category A listed building.

Preston is a hamlet adjacent to East Linton, East Lothian, Scotland.

There has been a mill on the site since the 16th century. The present mill dates from the 18th century and is in the care of the National Trust for Scotland. It was used commercially until 1959, and it produced oatmeal. The River Tyne still drives the water wheel, and the machinery can still be seen at work by visitors taking part in a tour. There is also an exhibition about milling, and a mill pond.

The engineer and millwright Andrew Meikle maintained the mill in the 18th century. In 1948 a flood submerged the buildings, and in 1950 a local land owner gave the mill to the National Trust for Scotland.
The milling firm Rank Hovis McDougall provided help with the renovation and expertise to allow the mill to be operative again.

Preston Mill consists of a kiln, a mill, and the miller's house. The mill wheel dates back to 1909. The mill is loved by visitors, painters and photographers, especially the kiln with its conical red pantile roof.

Photo gallery

References

 Poem about Preston Mill by Rowena M Love, published by the SCOTS (Scottish Corpus Of Texts & Speech) Project and the University of Glasgow.

External links

 Undiscovered Scotland - Preston Mill and Phantassie Doocot
 RCAHMS record for Preston Mill
 
 
 National Trust for Scotland webpage for Preston Mill
 National Trust for Scotland education resources for Preston Mill

Buildings and structures in East Lothian
History of East Lothian
Watermills in Scotland
Tourist attractions in East Lothian
Museums in East Lothian
National Trust for Scotland properties
Mill museums in Scotland
Category A listed buildings in East Lothian
East Linton